Devin Kalile Grayson is an American writer of comic books and novels.  Titles that she has written include Catwoman, Gotham Knights, The Titans, the Vertigo series USER, and Nightwing.

Early life
Grayson was born in New Haven, Connecticut and raised in Northern California. Her early ambition was to be an actress; she studied at the Berkeley Shakespeare Festival and attended the San Francisco School of the Arts, but while in community college she decided to become a writer instead, and subsequently transferred to Bard College in upstate New York.

Her interest in comics was first kindled when she happened to see an episode of Batman: The Animated Series on television.

Career
Grayson's first comic book script to see print was "Like Riding a Bike", a 10-page short that appeared in the Batman Chronicles in 1997. Other work for DC Comics and Marvel Comics soon followed.

Personal life
Grayson is openly bisexual. She has insulin-dependent Type I Diabetes, lives with Cody, an assistance dog trained to alert her to severe drops in her blood glucose levels, and volunteers for Early Alert Canines. She has also experienced chronic depression.

Awards and nominations
1999 Comics Buyer's Guide Award for Favorite Writer (nominated)
2000 Comics Buyer's Guide Award for Favorite Writer (nominated)
2001 GLAAD Media Award for Outstanding Comic book (for User; nominated)

Bibliography

Ahoy Comics
Edgar Allan Poe's Snifter of Blood #2 - writer of 'A Tipple of Amontillado' feature (2020)

Dark Horse Comics
Rewild Graphic Novel (2022)

DC Comics
Batman Plus Arsenal #1 (1997)
Batman Secret Files and Origins #1 (1997)
The Batman Chronicles #7, 9, 12, 18, 20 (1997, 1997, 1998, 1999, 2000)
Arsenal #1–4 (1998)
Catwoman #54–71, 1000000, Annual #4 (1998–1999)
Batman Annual #22 (1998)
Superman Adventures #18 (1998)
Nightwing/Huntress #1–4 (1998)
Batman 80 Page Giant #1 (1998)
Batman Villains: Secret Files & Origins #1 (1998)
JLA/Titans #1–#3 (1998–1999)
DCU Holiday Bash II, III (1998, 1999)
The Titans Secret Files #1 (1999)
The Titans #1–20 (#14 co-written with Brian K. Vaughan; #13, 17–20 co-written with Jay Faerber) (1999–2000)
Detective Comics #731, 741 (1999, 2000)
Batman #564 (1999)
Batman: Legends of the Dark Knight #116, 126, 177–178 (1999, 2000, 2004)
Shadow of the Bat #84, 92, 94 (1999, 1999, 2000)
JLA #32 (co-written with Mark Waid) (1999)
Nightwing Secret Files #1 (1999)
Relative Heroes #1–6 (2000)
Batman: Gotham City Secret Files #1 (2000)
Batman: Gotham Knights #1–11, 14–18, 20–32 (2000–2002)
Nightwing #53, 71–100, 107–117, Annual #1 (2001, 2002–2006)
Batman/Joker: Switch (2003)
Year One: Batman/Ra's Al Ghul #1–2 (2005)
Robin 80th Anniversary #1 - writer of Nightwing & The Titans feature (2020)
Green Arrow 80th Anniversary #1 - writer of Arsenal feature (2021)
Strange Love Adventures #1 - writer of Alfred feature (2022)
DC Pride 2022 - writer of Jon Kent feature (2022)

DC Comics/Vertigo
Flinch #7 - writer of Parade feature (1999) 
User #1–3 (2001)

DC Comics/Wildstorm
Everquest: Transformation (2002)
Matador #1–6 (2005–2006)

Dynamite Comics
Legends of Red Sonja #1 - writer of La Sonja Rossa feature (2013)
Vampirella; Feary Tales #1 - writer of Bluebeard's Blood feature (2014)

IDW
Womanthology: Heroic - writer of Mook & Me feature (2012)
Womanthology: Space #4 - writer of The Smell of Sunshine (2013)
Teenage Mutant Ninja Turtles: Dimension X #5 (2017)
Star Wars Forces of Destiny: Hera #1 (2018)
Ghostbusters: 35th Anniversary: Answer the Call #1 (2019)
GLOW Summer Special #1 (2019)

Marvel Comics
Black Widow Vol. 1 #1–3 (1999)
Black Widow: Break Down #1–3 (co-written with Greg Rucka, 2001)
Ghost Rider: The Hammer Lane #1–6 (Marvel Knight Imprint, 2001)
X-Men: Evolution #1–8 (2001–2002)
Girl Comics #1 - writer of X-Men feature (2010)
Power Pack #63 (2017)
Marvel Rising #0, Alpha #1, Omega #1 (2018)
Ms. Marvel #38 - writer of Zoe feature (2019)
War of the Realms: War Scrolls #2 - writer of Doctor Strange feature (2019)
Widowmakers: Red Guardian and Yelena Belova #1 (2020)

Novels
Batman: Rise of Sin Tzu (Published by Aspect, 2003)
Smallville: City (Published by Aspect, 2004)
DC Universe: Inheritance (Published by Warner Books, 2006)
Doctor Strange: The Fate of Dreams (Published by Marvel Comics, 2016)

References 

American comics writers
LGBT comics creators
LGBT people from Connecticut
Living people
Female comics writers
1970s births
Year of birth missing (living people)
Bard College alumni
Writers from New Haven, Connecticut
People with type 1 diabetes
People with mood disorders
Bisexual women
21st-century LGBT people
American bisexual writers